The 2008 Acropolis Rally of Greece was the seventh round of the 2008 World Rally Championship. It took place between May 29-June 1.

Results

Special Stages
All dates and times are EEST (UTC+3).

External links
 

Acropolis Rally
Acropolis Rally